The Beneteau 31 is a French sailboat, that was designed by Groupe Finot and first built in 2002.

Production
The design was built by Beneteau in France, but it is now out of production.

Design

The Beneteau 31 is a small recreational keelboat, built predominantly of glassfibre. It has a fractional sloop rig, a nearly-plumb stem, a reverse transom, an internally-mounted spade-type rudder controlled by a wheel and a fixed fin keel. It displaces  and carries  of ballast.

The design has a PHRF racing average handicap of 135 with a high of 129 and low of 153.

See also
List of sailing boat types

Similar sailboats
Allmand 31
Catalina 310
Corvette 31
Douglas 31
Herreshoff 31
Hunter 31
Hunter 31-2
Hunter 310
Hunter 320
Marlow-Hunter 31
Niagara 31
Nonsuch 324
Roue 20
Tanzer 31

References

External links

Keelboats
2000s sailboat type designs
Sailing yachts
Sailboat types built by Beneteau
Sailboat type designs by Groupe Finot